Jason Kosec (born June 19, 1987) is a former professional Canadian football linebacker. He was drafted by the Edmonton Eskimos in the sixth round of the 2009 CFL Draft. He played CIS football for the Western Ontario Mustangs.

1987 births
Living people
Canadian football linebackers
Edmonton Elks players
Players of Canadian football from Ontario
Sportspeople from Mississauga
Western Mustangs football players